Ascension is the seventh studio album by Japanese R&B singer Misia, released on February 7, 2007. It is her first album in over two years and last to be released under the Avex subsidiary Rhythmedia Tribe. The album was later re-released under BMG Japan.

The album is certified Gold for shipment of 100,000 copies.

Track listing

Charts

Oricon sales charts

Physical sales charts

Release history

References

External links
 

2007 albums
Misia albums
Avex Group albums
Sony Music Entertainment Japan albums
Japanese-language albums